Mario Fernandes may refer to:
Mário Gil Fernandes (born 1982), Portuguese basketball player
Mário Fernandes (footballer) (born 1990), Brazilian-born Russian footballer
Mário Fernandes da Graça Machungo (1940–2020), Mozambican politician